Dark Space is a space opera novel by science fiction author Marianne de Pierres.  It was a finalist for best science fiction novel in the 2007 Aurealis Awards.

Reviews 
It was reviewed in short in The Guardian.

References

2007 Australian novels
2007 science fiction novels
Australian science fiction novels